El Blog de la Feña is the debut album by the Chilean actress and singer Denise Rosenthal. The album was released on August 14, 2008 in Chile via Feria Music Records, the first and lead single of the album was "No Quiero Escuchar Tu Voz" .

Track listing

"Si tu me Quieres" (Gonzalo Yañez) – 3:04
"No Quiero Escuchar Tu Voz" (Gonzalo Yañez) – 2:46
"Hasta Las 6" (Gonzalo Yañez, Monk&Trot) – 3:19
"Amiga" (Denise Rosenthal, Liselotte Schalchili) – 3:51
"Espérame" (Arturo Fontaine, Hector Fontaine) – 2:53
"La Vida Sin Tí" (Gonzalo Yañez) – 3:10
"Esta Vez" (Arturo Fontaine, Hector Fontaine) – 2:55
"Te He Vuelto a Encontrar" (Arturo Fontaine, Hector Fontaine) – 2:32
"Creo" (Arturo Fontaine, Hector Fontaine) – 3:22
"Bye Bye" (Monk&Trot) – 3:18 saires nado sguel 
"Déjate Llevar" (Gonzalo Yañez) – 2:48

References

External links
El Blog De La Feña.cl Official website as Feña. 
Official My Space 

2008 debut albums